Austromuellera trinervia, commonly known as Mueller's silky oak, is a species of rainforest tree of the family Proteaceae from north-eastern Queensland. It was described in 1930 by Cyril T. White, having been collected near Boonjie on the Atherton Tableland.

References

trinervia
Flora of Queensland
Proteales of Australia
Plants described in 1930